The Anglo-Saxon lyre is a large plucked and strummed lyre that was played in Anglo-Saxon England. The oldest lyre found in England dates before 450 AD and the most recent dates to the 10th century. The Anglo-Saxon lyre is depicted in several illustrations and mentioned in Anglo-Saxon literature and poetry. Despite this, all knowledge of the instrument was forgotten until the archaeological excavation at Sutton Hoo in the 1930s revealed the remnants of a lyre. The Museum of London Archaeology describes the Anglo-Saxon lyre as the most important stringed instrument in the ancient world.

At the time of the Sutton Hoo discovery there were no known lyres in Northern Europe, and Southern European lyre designs differed so greatly that it was not identified as a lyre. Archaeologists mistakenly  turned to the only other known stringed instrument in the region, the Irish harp, an instrument not known to exist for another 400 years after Sutton Hoo. An awkward and unconvincing assembly of the fragments of the lyre into the shape of an Irish harp was put on display in the British Museum, lasting only a few years until observers knowledgeable in early musical instruments reassembled it correctly in the 1940s.
When this was done the realisation came that the lyre was a "lost" musical instrument that history had forgotten. This was until the 1970s, when in Germany a second lyre was discovered, this time almost intact. This confirmed the accuracy of the reconstruction of the Sutton Hoo lyre, and also that the instrument was not unique to England. Shortly after the German discovery more lyres were unearthed in Scandinavia.

All lyre finds to date 

To date 26 lyres of this type have been discovered in archaeological excavations: one in Denmark, eight in England, eight in Germany, two in the Netherlands, three in Norway and four in Sweden.

Etymology 
Today the lyre is defined as an instrument where the strings are parallel to the soundboard, similar to a violin or guitar. A harp is an instrument where the strings are perpendicular to the soundboard. This classification is entirely modern, as historically people made little distinction between lyres and harps. In Old English the lyre was called a "hearpe" and in old Norse a "harpa".

There is no modern universal name for the lyre used across the six countries it is found in. The generic name in England for the instrument, the Anglo-Saxon lyre, was created decades before it was discovered that the instrument also existed in five more countries. In the other countries where lyres have been discovered, generic names have not found popularity, but terms occasionally used include "Germanic lyre" in Germany, "Saxon lyre" in Holland, and "Viking" or "Nordic lyre" in Scandinavia. All of these also suffer from regional bias, so are not accepted as universal names. Some suggestions for a universal name include "warrior's lyre" or "war lyre", as most of the unearthed lyres have been found in warrior burials, but these suggestions have not been popular.

Construction 
Of the lyres analysed, all the bodies are made of maple, oak, or a combination of the two. The material for the bridges on the lyres varies greatly, including bronze, amber, antler, horn, willow and pine. The preferred wood for the pegs being ash, hazel or willow. The lyres range from 53 cm (Koln) to 81 cm in length (Oberflacht (84)). Half the lyres found have six strings, a quarter have seven strings, and the remainder five or eight strings, with only two having the latter.

Anglo-Saxon lyre in ancient images 

Apart from archaeological finds, images of the lyre have been uncovered by researchers. The Vespasian Psalter, an early 8th-century Anglo-Saxon illustrated book originating from Southumbria (Northern Mercia), contains the best image of the lyre found. It shows King David playing the lyre with his court musicians. The image is a common one repeated across the Christian world, usually with David playing a harp; however, in some English versions he has an Anglo-Saxon lyre, such as the one in the Vespasian Psalter. The image gives some insight into how the lyre was played, notably the left hand being used to block strings showing he was using a type of play known as strum and block. This same method of lyre playing appears on many Ancient Greek illustrations of lyre playing.

The Durham Cassiodorus is a book containing an image of King David playing the Anglo-Saxon lyre. The book originates from Northumbria some time in the 8th century. The image of David playing is awkward and may have been drawn by an artist who had never seen the lyre actually being played.

The oldest image of the lyre comes from Gotland in Sweden, where a rock carving dating from the 6th century has been interpreted as an image of a lyre.

Another image of the lyre being plucked can be found in the Utrecht Psalter, a 9th Century book of illustrations from the Netherlands.

Playing the lyre 
Much research has been done by scholars into how the lyre was played. This took two forms: early musicians who used their knowledge of historic music and instruments to work out how to play it and historians who read old texts to find mentions of it.

The Vespasian Psalter and Durham Cassiodorus provide the only good images of the lyre being held. These show it placed upon one knee with one hand held behind it to block or pluck strings. Prolonged use of it in this way would be difficult, as the left arm would tire, having no place to rest upon. In five of the lyre finds, evidence of a wrist strap has been found to take the weight of the left arm. These finds consist of either leather loops or plugs on the side of the lyre to fit a strap on. Marks have also been found on the arms of some lyres, indicating when the left hand was not being used to play, it was gripping the arms of the lyre.

Tuning 
How the lyre was tuned is unknown. The only contemporary account of lyres comes from the Frankish monk and music theorist Hucbald in his book De Harmonica Institutione, written around 880 AD. In it he describes how he believes the Roman philosopher, Boethius (480–524 AD), would have tuned his six-string lyre. Whether how the Romans tuned their lyres is transferable to Anglo-Saxon lyre is debated among aficionados. Hucbald's conclusion was that Boethius used the first six notes of the major scale.

Block and strum technique 
The block and strum technique seems to have been a widely used and very common technique for lyre playing, images of it being used can be found on Ancient Egyptian wall art, on Ancient Greek Urns and specifically for the Anglo-Saxon Lyre on the Vespasian Psalter. To use the technique the lyre is strummed while the other hand mutes several strings, so only strings which combine to make chords are heard. The number of chords a lyre can make is limited compared to a fretted instrument and is also dependent on the number of strings it has. An alternative strum and block technique to chord playing is to tune one or more strings as drone strings and use the remaining strings to play melody, similar to a hurdy-gurdy.

Plucking 
The Utrecht Psalter contains an image of the Anglo-Saxon lyre being plucked, the musician is shown plucking two strings simultaneously creating a chord. Plectrums were also used to play the lyre, the Anglo-Saxons having several words for plectrum, the main one being hearpenaegel. Several copper objects have been found the exact size and shape of modern-day plastic plectrums and may have been plectrums, however no proven plectrums survive so their make up can only be surmised. Other possibilities include quills made from bird feathers which were known to have been used to play medieval lutes, medieval Ouds used plectrums made animal horn and wood.

Anglo-Saxon lyre in literature 
Among the English, "Music was seen as coming from the Gods and was a gift from Woden who was, amongst many things, the God of knowledge, wisdom and poetry and as such bestowed the ‘magic’ of music on the people. This is how music was seen, as magic. There is no doubt about this. There is evidence in the old tales and the early writings of the Anglo Saxons confirming this position. It was also seen as a power to do good or evil, to help cure people of maladies of the mind, soul or body as well as able to inflict harm on enemies and to conjure up spirits that would be of help or to do your bidding against enemies."

There are 21 mentions of the lyre in Anglo-Saxon poetry, five of these in Beowulf. Mentions of the lyre in literature commonly associate it as accompanying storytelling, being used during celebrations or in context of war.

The venerable Bede mentions the lyre was passed around during feasts, so as part of the merriment people could pick it up and sing songs. This is similar to other instruments such as the bagpipes which are also described as being passed around at feasts (Exeter Codex). The songs played on the lyre include Anglo-Saxon epic poetry and it is likely that performances of Beowulf, the Wanderer, Dior, the Seafarer etc., were enacted with the lyre providing the backing track.

Being used as a vehicle for English culture, the lyre became associated with English nationalism and anti-Norman sentiment and was outlawed by the Normans in the 12th century.

Scottish lyre 
In 2010 in High Pasture Cave on the Isle of Skye, Scotland, a piece of wood dating from around 400BC was found, which was thought to be a bridge for a lyre. Although burnt and broken, the notches where strings would have been placed could be distinguished.

Gaulish Lyre 
In 1988, a stone bust from the 2nd or 1st century BC was discovered in Brittany, France which depicted a figure wearing a torc playing a lyre which appeared to be structurally similar to the lyres constructed later in Germanic speaking regions, but with a wider, rounder body like the turtle-shell lyres of ancient Mediterranean cultures. Reconstructions and replicas have been made of this lyre, lyre de Paule, wherein both the body and yoke are made of wood, like the early medieval Anglo-Saxon lyres.

Bibliography 
 Vespasian Psalter, 8th century
 Durham Cassiodorus, 8th Century
 Utrecht Psalter, 9th Century

References

External links
 The Lyre Facebook Group - a group specifically for the study of ancient lyres (not modern), including professionals and experts in the field
Norþhærpe - How To Play Anglo-Saxon, Viking & Germanic Lyres + 80 Tunes, 2021 - Paul Wilding
 anglosaxonlyreproject.co.uk

Lyres
Early musical instruments
European musical instruments
Sutton Hoo
Anglo-Saxon art
Anglo-Saxon society